Karaoğlan is a Turkish historical comic book that was created in 1963 by Suat Yalaz.
It was first published on January 3, 1962 daily in Akşam newspaper. Karaoğlan was started to be published by Yalaz as a separate comics magazine on April 1, 1963; and was continued to be published by various publishers until 2002.

Synopsis
The comic's story takes place between the 12th and 13th centuries in Central Asia during the reign of Genghis Khan. The main character, Karaoğlan, is a young Uygur Turkic adventurer who worked as a scout in Genghis Khan's army. Karaoğlan is portrayed as a 23-year-old adventurous and brave youngster. He is nomadic and travels throughout Eurasia in his stories. He traveled as far as China, India, Constantinople and Siberia. He is accompanied by his faithful friend Balaban, an ex-captain in the Mongolian army and his father Baybora. His nemesis is Camoka, a Mongolian bandit who raids villages with his men.

Karaoğlan has an interesting origin story. His mother was killed in a tribal blood feud and his father (which he will reunite with years later) Baybora had to run while Karaoğlan was just a baby. He was raised by a woodsman. Because he was never officially named with a ritual by his father (this was the tradition in those times) the boy remained nameless. The woodsman called him "black boy" (karaoğlan) because of his long black hair.

Suat Yalaz based his stories on Turkish history and folklore. He was faithful to the language and daily life of that era. Because it originally started as a daily newspaper comic strip, stories were focused for a mature audience with serious issues of war, politics, history and eroticism. Humor is also an important part of stories. Characters are never portrayed as two-dimensional heroes or villains. The socio-political aura of 1960s and 1970s Turkey is also reflected in Yalaz's stories.

International publishing
Karaoğlan is the first Turkish comic book to be published internationally. After Yalaz moved to France, Karaoğlan was published in Paris with the title of "Kebir" for seven years. Kebir comic books got successful and began distribution to French-speaking regions of Europe and Canada, as well as north African countries like Algeria, Tunisia, Morocco etc. The Kebir comics started publishing as monthly, then turned to bi-weekly. This success brought new editions of Kebir comics in English and Arabic (in Iraq under the title "Desert Eagle" at the end of the 1970s). A Russian edition with the title "БОЭКАШИ" (Bozkashii) was also planned by the French publishers but later was canceled.

List of Adventures

 Asya Kaplanı
 Baybora'nın Oğlu
 Altay'dan Gelen Yiğit
 Semerkand Casusu
 Buzlu Çöller Tilkisi
 Yeşil Ejder
 Kanlı Saltanat (Uğursuz Saltanat)
 Bizanslı Güzel Vasiliya
 Tek Gözlü Albız
 Asya'yı Titreten Korku
 Samara-Şeyhin Kızı
 Ötügen'in Üç Atlısı
 Sarı Bayrak
 Yavru Düşman
 Çöl Şeytanı
 Ölüm Yoldaşı
 Bizanslı Zarba
 Şeytan'ın Çakalları
 Çayır Korsanları
 Dokuz Tuğlu Kahraman
 Uzun Saçlı Kahraman
 Gökçe'nin Baykuşu
 Cengiz Han'ın Habercisi
 Bağan Tigin
 Ergenekon
 Kızıl Kule
 Tiyen-Şan Canavarı
 Kılıçların Gölgesinde
 Ölüm Süvarileri
 Uygur Güzeli
 Sarı Büyü
 Camoka'nın İntikamı
 Alamut Kalesi
 Kurt Başlı Sancak
 Tibet Fedaisi
 Ölüm Geçidi
 Yeşil Gözlü Dilber
 Kanlı Tuzak
 Kudüs İlahesi
 Üç Gözlü Mabut
 Kırbaç Altında
 Gök Han'ın Mirası
 Kafkas Çiceği
 Kaplan'ın Adaleti
 Ulah Han'ın Gazabı
 Dağlar Benimdir
 Dağlar Benimdir 2
 Fedailer Alayı
 Bozkurt Gelini
 Kara Panter
 Kara Panter 2
 Cengiz'in Gazabı
 Cengiz'in Gazabı 2
 Her Kılıç Bir Kın İçin
 Hind Yıldızı
 Dünyalar Hakimi
 Dağlar Fatihi
 Camoka'nın dönüşü
 Deniz Ejderi
 Düşman Uyumaz
 Sarı Baltuk Hocanın Sırrı
 Suruç Dağlarında
 İnsan Avı
 Ötügen'in Dört Atlısı
 Acuna Bedel Oğul
 Selçuklunun Şeref Sözü
 Tumanbay'ın Gelini
 Kayıp Ülke
 Fırat'ın Sahipleri
 Mor Kahküllü Şehzade
 Ullimalı Kanlı Sultan
 Çin Duvarlarında Dehşet
 Demir Maske
 Çakal Adamlar
 Bir Ölümcül Oyun Bozkaşi
 İnce Yılan Hanı
 Kul Bakay'ın Mezarı
 Banı Çicek
 Ya Devlet Başa Ya Guzgun Leşe
 Delice'nin 4 Kızı

Adaptations
Karaoğlan was first adapted to movie by Suat Yalaz as writer, director and producer in 1965. Yalaz searched for a long period for the actor to play Karaoğlan and found a young, (then) unknown theater actor from Ankara, Kartal Tibet. Yalaz and Tibet made five movies from 1965 to 1967, which brought great fame to the actor. Suat Yalaz replaced Tibet with Kuzey Vargın in 1969 movie Karaoğlan-Samara the Daughter of Sheik. In 1972 Tibet returned to the role for a last time in Karaoğlan Geliyor, which was directed by Mehmet Aslan.

Karaoğlan was also adapted for television as a mini-series in 2002. Series was directed by Cem Akyoldaş and Erdogan Engin. Kaan Urgancıoğlu played Karaoğlan, and Baybora was played by Serdar Gökhan. On June 24, 2010, in a TV interview Yalaz mentioned his new Karaoğlan movie project which is early stages of development. The new movie was released in 2013, starring Volkan Keskin as Karaoğlan, Hakan Karahan as Baybora, Müge Boz as Bayırgülü, and Hasan Yalnızoğlu as Camoka. The movie is directed by Kudret Sabancı.

Trivia
 "Karaoğlan" was also the nickname of Turkish politician Bülent Ecevit.
 Turkish postal service PTT printed a series of memorial stamps to honour Karaoğlan in 2006.

Notes and references

External links
 http://www.suatyalaz.com

Turkish comics
Turkish comics titles
1962 comics debuts
Comics characters introduced in 1962
2002 comics endings
Action-adventure comics
Comics set in the 12th century
Comics set in the 13th century
Fictional Turkish people
Fictional medieval people
Comics adapted into films
Comics adapted into television series
Male characters in comics